The 2013 Karuizawa International Curling Championship was held from April 18 to 21 at the Karuizawa Ice Park in Karuizawa, Japan.

Men

Teams
The teams are listed as follows:

Round-robin standings
Final round-robin standings

Round-robin results
All draw times listed in Japan Standard Time (UTC+9).

Draw 1
Thursday, April 18, 9:00

Draw 2
Thursday, April 18, 13:00

Draw 3
Thursday, April 18, 16:30

Draw 4
Thursday, April 18, 20:00

Draw 5
Friday, April 19, 9:00

Draw 6
Friday, April 19, 12:30

Draw 7
Friday, April 19, 16:00

Draw 8
Friday, April 19, 19:30

Draw 9
Saturday, April 19, 9:00

Draw 10
Saturday, April 19, 12:30

Tiebreakers

Round 1
Saturday, April 20, 15:30

Round 2
Saturday, April 20, 17:30

Playoffs

Quarterfinals
Saturday, April 20, 19:30

Semifinals
Sunday, April 21, 9:00

Bronze-medal game
Sunday, April 21, 15:00

Gold-medal game
Sunday, April 21, 15:00

Women

Teams
The teams are listed as follows:

Round-robin standings
Final round-robin standings

Round-robin results
All draw times listed in Japan Standard Time (UTC+9).

Draw 1
Thursday, April 18, 9:00

Draw 2
Thursday, April 18, 13:00

Draw 3
Thursday, April 18, 16:30

Draw 4
Thursday, April 18, 20:00

Draw 5
Friday, April 19, 9:00

Draw 6
Friday, April 19, 12:30

Draw 7
Friday, April 19, 16:00

Draw 8
Friday, April 19, 19:30

Draw 9
Saturday, April 19, 9:00

Draw 10
Saturday, April 19, 12:30

Playoffs

Quarterfinals
Saturday, April 20, 19:30

Semifinals
Sunday, April 21, 9:00

Bronze-medal game
Sunday, April 21, 12:00

Gold-medal game
Sunday, April 21, 12:00

References

External links

2013 in curling